Scelio nigricoxa is a species of parasitoid wasp in the subfamily, Scelioninae, which was first described in 1914 by Alan Parkhurst Dodd.

The holotype was collected in Gordonvale, Queensland.

References

Taxa described in 1914
Taxa named by Alan Parkhurst Dodd